The following is a list of Major League Baseball players, retired or active. As of the end of the 2011 season, there have been 1,295 players with a last name that begins with H who have been on a major league roster at some point.

H
For reasons of space, this list has been split into three pages:
 Yamid Haad through Jason Hazleton (Ha)
 Ed Head through Lloyd Hittle (He–Hi)
 Myril Hoag through Adam Hyzdu (Ho–Hz)

External links
Last Names starting with H - Baseball-Reference.com

 H